Blanche Chloe Grant (1874–1948) was an American artist, magazine illustrator and wrter. She is remembered as a muralist as well as a painter of Native Americans. Born in Leavenworth, Kansas, she studied at Vassar College, at the School of the Museum of Fine Arts in Boston, the Pennsylvania Academy of Fine Arts, and the Art Student's League. She studied with Howard Pyle and in 1911, along with Ethel Leach and Olive Rush, she was living in Pyle's studio, when he died on a trip to Italy. By 1914 she was established as a magazine illustrator and landscape painter.

Grant became an associate professor in the School of Fine Arts at University of Nebraska in 1916.

Grant came to Taos, NM in 1920 on vacation and decided to settle there permanently. She wrote several books related to the area and edited the Taos Valley News. Her paintings can be found in the Harwood Museum of Art in Taos and New Mexico Museum of Art in Santa Fe.

Murals
Grant produced murals for the New Mexico Technical University library (“Mine”) in Socorro, New Mexico, and for the Taos Presbyterian Church, the latter in 1921. They are no longer extant.  Grant was buried at that church.

Selected bibliography 
 Taos Indians (1925)
 Kit Carson's own story of his life (1926)
 When Old Trails Were New: The Story of Taos (1934)
 Doña Lona: a story of old Taos and Santa Fé (1941)

References

1874 births
1948 deaths
American women painters
American muralists
Artists from Taos, New Mexico
20th-century American women artists
People from Leavenworth, Kansas
People of the New Deal arts projects
Federal Art Project artists
Artists from Kansas
Vassar College alumni
School of the Museum of Fine Arts at Tufts alumni
University of Nebraska faculty
Writers from Kansas
Writers from Taos, New Mexico
20th-century American writers
20th-century American women writers
Women muralists
American women academics